The Tuen Mun River is a river in Tuen Mun, New Territories, Hong Kong. It has many tributaries, with major ones coming from Lam Tei, Kau Keng Shan, Hung Shui Hang and Nai Wai. It flows south, bisecting Tuen Mun New Town. It eventually feeds into the Tuen Mun Typhoon Shelter, which is part of Castle Peak Bay.

See also
 Lam Tei 
 List of rivers and nullahs in Hong Kong
 San Fat Estate

External links

Rivers of Hong Kong, in Chinese
Map of Tuen Mun River

Tuen Mun
Rivers of Hong Kong